Point Fortin Civic F.C. is a Trinidad and Tobago professional football club, based in Point Fortin, that plays in the TT Pro League.

Point Fortin Civic applied for admission and were accepted back in the Pro League after a being expelled following the league's inaugural season.

Stadium
The club plays its home matches in Mahaica Oval Pavilion located in Point Fortin.

Honours
Trinidad and Tobago Cup:
1969

Current squad

References

External links
Soccerway Profile

 
Football clubs in Trinidad and Tobago